Erwin Nathanson (February 17, 1928 – April 5, 2016) was an American author who wrote the novel The Dirty Dozen (1965), which was adapted into the film of the same name.

Background
Nathanson was born in 1928 in The Bronx. His mother suffered from depression and went into an institution when he was two years old. He was placed in a Jewish orphanage in Manhattan and lived there until he was seven, when he was sent to the Hebrew National Orphan Home in Yonkers. He remained there until he graduated high school.

Nathanson majored in anthropology at New York University. Nathanson held a variety of writing and editing jobs. He was a copy editor for Fairchild Publications in New York, a reporter for the Arlington Sun in Virginia, a stringer for The Washington Post and a freelance magazine writer.

By 1959, he was living in Los Angeles, where he worked as associate editor for Daring Detective magazine and an editing job for a chain of pulp magazines.

The Dirty Dozen
In 1965, Nathanson wrote the war novel The Dirty Dozen, a story about 12 servicemen, convicted of robbery, murder and rape, who are sent on a suicide mission to blow up a chateau of German generals just before D-Day with the promise of commuted sentences to those who survive.

The novel was inspired by the supposedly true story of World War II criminal soldiers who got the nickname "the Dirty Dozen" (or "Filthy Thirteen" which was an actual group of American paratroopers) for their refusal to bathe and who were said to have been sent off on a similar mission. Nathanson heard the story from his producer friend Russ Meyer, who said he learned of the tale while working as a combat photographer during World War II.

Although Nathanson researched in vain for two years to verify the story's accuracy, he still received a contract for a book. He and his editor fictionalized the story. The best-selling novel sold more than two million copies and was translated into 10 languages.

Death
Nathanson died on April 5, 2016, of heart failure in his  Laguna Niguel, California home. He was 88. He is survived by his partner Elizabeth Henderson and son Michael from his marriage to Mary Ann Nathanson.

Bibliography
The Dirty Dozen (1965) 
The Latecomers (1970)
It Gave Everybody Something To Do (with Louise Thoresen) (1973)
A Dirty Distant War (1987)- The Sequel to The Dirty Dozen
Knight's Cross (with Aaron Bank) (1993)
Lovers and Schemers (2003)

References

1928 births
2016 deaths
American war novelists
American male novelists
New York University alumni
People from Yonkers, New York
20th-century American novelists
21st-century American novelists
Writers from the Bronx
People from Laguna Niguel, California
20th-century American male writers
21st-century American male writers
Novelists from California
Novelists from New York (state)